"Spill the Wine" is the debut single by singer Eric Burdon and the band War, released in May 1970. It was backed by the non-album track "Magic Mountain", and was War's first Billboard chart hit.

Song description and history

"Spill the Wine" first appeared on the album Eric Burdon Declares War and runs 4:51. Its writing credits include the members of War: Papa Dee Allen, Harold Brown, Eric Burdon, B.B. Dickerson, Lonnie Jordan, Charles Miller, Lee Oskar, and Howard E. Scott.  The song was inspired by an accident in which keyboardist Lonnie Jordan spilled wine on a mixing board. It features a prevalent flute solo, and the sound of a woman speaking Spanish—a friend of Eric Burdon—is heard in the background. An edited version, released as a promo single for radio stations and subsequently included on most compilations, omits the middle spoken recitation, plus one chorus. The song was re-released as a single in 1996, after a remix by Junior Vasquez.

Chart history
"Spill the Wine" was War's first hit, and their only hit with Eric Burdon as vocalist. It peaked at number 3 on the Billboard Hot 100.  Billboard ranked the single the number 20 song of 1970. It was also a top 3 hit in Canada and Australia in mid-November 1970.

Weekly charts

Year-end charts

Certifications

Use in media

Films
"Spill the Wine" has been used in the sound tracks of the following motion pictures:
 Boogie Nights (1997)
 Deuce Bigalow: Male Gigolo (1999)
 Remember the Titans (2000)

Television
The song was used in the sound tracks of the following television episodes: 
 The Fresh Prince of Bel-Air, episode "That's No Lady, That's My Cousin";
 Dexter, episode "A Horse of a Different Color" (while characters Joey Quinn and Angel Batista are smoking marijuana).
 Shameless, episode "Requiem for a Slut"

Cover versions

1970s through 1990s

"Spill the Wine" has been covered by:
 Melvin Sparks, on his Sparks album (1970)
 The Isley Brothers, on their Givin' It Back album (1971)
 2nu on their Ponderous album (1989)
 Lighter Shade of Brown on their Brown & Proud album (1990)
 Freaked Out Flower Children on their 1991 album Love In; reached number 31 on the Australian ARIA Singles Chart.
 Michael Hutchence on the Barb Wire soundtrack (1996).

2000s–2010s
In 2001, The B-Side Players included a cover on their album Movement. The same year, Los Mocosos included a version on their album Shades of Brown.

In 2004, flautist Alexander Zonjic performed a cover of "Spill the Wine" for his album Seldom Blues.

San Francisco band Vinyl covered "Spill the Wine" on their album Frogshack Music Volume II in 2009, in a track featuring Sugar Pie DeSanto and Marcus Scott.

The revival of the 1970s band The L.A. Carpool covered "Spill the Wine" with a Latin salsa flair in 2012, in a track that featured well-known Latin drummer Richie "Gajate" Garcia and other well-known Latin musicians.

On October 31, 2013, jam band Widespread Panic covered the song, opening the second set of their show at UNO arena in New Orleans, and again at Philips Arena in Atlanta, Georgia on New Year's Eve of 2013.

On February 23, 2014, Bruce Springsteen and the E Street Band opened their concert at the Hope Estate Winery in the Hunter Valley of NSW, Australia, with a nine-minute version of the song, the world premiere of their version.

In 2019, the song was released by Michael Hutchence as the lead single from the compilation album Mystify: A Musical Journey with Michael Hutchence.

Miscellaneous
In a 2008 interview, Lonnie Jordan referred to Eric Burdon as the first Latin rapper in pop music.

See also
 List of 1970s one-hit wonders in the United States

References

External links
 [ "Spill the Wine" Song Review] on Allmusic website

1970 songs
1970 debut singles
1971 singles
War (American band) songs
Eric Burdon songs
The Isley Brothers songs
Cashbox number-one singles
Songs about alcohol
Songs about dreams
Song recordings produced by Jerry Goldstein (producer)
MGM Records singles
Songs written by Eric Burdon